In Murrinh-Patha mythology, Nogamain is a god who gives spirit children to mortal parents.  He created himself from nothingness.

References

Australian Aboriginal gods
Creator gods
Fertility gods
Childhood gods